The Duchy of Pomerania-Rügenwalde, also known as the Duchy of Rügenwalde, and the Duchy of Darłowo, was a feudal duchy in Western Pomerania within the Holy Roman Empire. Its capital was Darłowo. It was ruled by the Griffin dynasty. It existed in the early modern period, from 1569 to 1625.

The state was formed in 1569, from the part of the territory of Pomerania-Stettin, with duke Barnim X, as its first ruler. It existed until 1625, when, under the rule of duke Bogislaw XIV, it was incorporated into the unified Duchy of Pomerania.

List of rulers 
 Barnim X (1569–1603)
 Bogislaw XIII (1603–1606)
 George II and Bogislaw XIV (1606–1617)
 Bogislaw XIV (1617–1625)

Citations

Notes

References

Bibliography 
Rodowód książąt pomorskich by E. Rymar. Szczecin. Pomeranian Library. 2005. ISBN 83-87879-50-9, OCLC 69296056. (Polish)

Former countries in Europe
Former monarchies of Europe
Duchies of the Holy Roman Empire
Rugenwalde
16th-century establishments in Europe
17th-century disestablishments in Europe
16th century in the Holy Roman Empire
17th century in the Holy Roman Empire
States and territories established in 1569
States and territories disestablished in 1625